Christoph Hoerl (born 1967) is a German philosopher and Professor of Philosophy at the University of Warwick where he is also Deputy Head of Department of Philosophy. He is known for his works on philosophy of mind and philosophy of psychology.

Books
Time and Memory: Issues in Philosophy and Psychology , edited with Teresa McCormack, Oxford University Press, 2001
N. Eilan, C. Hoerl, T. McCormack & J. Roessler (eds.) (2005): Joint Attention: Communication and Other Minds: Issues in Philosophy and Psychology, Oxford University Press*
C. Hoerl, T. McCormack & S. Beck (eds.) (2011): Understanding Counterfactuals, Understanding Causation: Issues in Philosophy and Psychology. Oxford University Press
T. McCormack, C. Hoerl & S. Butterfill (eds.) (2011): Tool Use and Causal Cognition: Issues in Philosophy and Psychology. Oxford University Pre

References

External links
Christoph Hoerl at the University of Warwick

British philosophers
Philosophy academics
Living people
Academics of the University of Warwick
1967 births
Philosophers of mind
Alumni of the University of Oxford
Philosophers of psychology